The 2008 Amstel Gold Race is the 43rd edition of the Amstel Gold Race classic cycle race and took place on April 20, 2008. It was held on a  course from Maastricht to Cauberg as the fifth event of the 2008 UCI ProTour. Spanish rider Alejandro Valverde of  finished third.

Result

Individual 2008 UCI ProTour standings after race
As of April 20, 2008, after the 2008 Amstel Gold Race.    After winning the Amstel Gold Race, Damiano Cunego became the new leader of the 2008 UCI ProTour.

See also
2008 in road cycling

References

External links

2008 in Dutch sport
2008 UCI ProTour
Amstel Gold Race